Alberto Martínez Díaz (born 27 October 1962), known as Berto, is a Spanish former professional footballer who played as a midfielder.

Club career
Born in Lugo, Galicia, Berto's career was mainly associated to Real Oviedo for which he played 15 seasons, appearing in a team-best 512 official matches. He signed in 1984 from Asturias neighbours Caudal Deportivo in the lower leagues, and spent his first four years in the Segunda División, promoting to La Liga in 1988.

Berto made his debut in the Spanish top flight on 3 September 1988, playing the full 90 minutes in a 1–0 home win against Real Sociedad and scoring one of his six league goals during the campaign. He only competed at that level until his departure in 1999, more often than not as a starter and captain, and added two appearances in the UEFA Cup with his main club, both in the 1991–92 edition.

Berto retired from football in 2004 at nearly 42 years of age, after spells with SD Ponferradina in the Segunda División B and amateurs Águilas CF and Astur CF. For his transfer to the latter, he revealed he received death threats.

International career
Berto earned one cap for Spain, the occurrence taking place on 4 September 1991 as he came on as a 56th minute substitute for Manolo in a 2–1 friendly victory over Uruguay in Oviedo.

Honours
Oviedo
Copa de la Liga (Segunda División): 1985

References

External links

1962 births
Living people
Spanish footballers
Footballers from Lugo
Association football midfielders
La Liga players
Segunda División players
Segunda División B players
Tercera División players
Caudal Deportivo footballers
Real Oviedo players
SD Ponferradina players
Águilas CF players
Spain international footballers